The 1997 Oceania Junior Women's Handball Championship, was the first official competition for junior women's national handball teams from Oceania. It was held from December 11–12, 1998 in Melbourne, Victoria, Australia. It also acted as the qualifying competition for the 1997 IHF Women's Junior World Championship, securing one Vacancy for the World Championship.

Australia and New Zealand played a two-game series to determine the winner. Australia was the winner  but decided to defer its entry to the World Cup and New Zealand also deferred.

Overview

References

External links 
Oceania handball archive

Oceania Handball Challenge Trophy
1997 Oceania Handball Nations Cup
Oceania Handball Challenge Trophy
1997 in Australian sport
Women's handball in Australia